DZYM (1539 AM) Radyo Pilipino is a radio station owned and operated by Radyo Pilipino Media Group through its licensee Philippine Radio Corporation. The station's studio and transmitter are located along Felix Y. Manalo Ave., Brgy. Pag-asa, San Jose, Occidental Mindoro.

References

Radio stations established in 1970
Radio stations in Mindoro